Gilbert M. Román (born September 15, 1962) is the chief judge of the Colorado Court of Appeals.

Early life and education

Román was born on September 15, 1962 in Wichita, Kansas. He earned a bachelor's degree in political science from Colorado State University in 1984 and received his Juris Doctor from the University of Michigan Law School in 1987.

Legal career

He was a partner in the law firm of Rothgerber Johnson & Lyons in Denver, Colorado.  He served as  Associate General Counsel for Kaiser-Hill Corporation in Broomfield, Colorado and was a partner in the firms of Roman, Benezra & Culver, LLC in Lakewood, Colorado and Feiger, Collison & Killmer in Denver.  He was an associate with the firm of Sherman & Howard in Denver.

Appointment to state court of appeals

He was appointed to the court by Governor Bill Owens on August 1, 2005. He was retained by voters in 2008 and again in 2016. His current term expires on January 13, 2025. On October 8, 2021, chief justice Brian Boatright appointed Román to serve as the chief judge of the Colorado Court of Appeals, effective December 31, 2021.

Personal

Román is married to his wife Donna, and they have three children.

References

External links
Biography on Colorado Judicial Branch website

1962 births
Living people
20th-century American lawyers
21st-century American judges
21st-century American lawyers
Colorado Court of Appeals judges
Colorado lawyers
Colorado State University alumni
Hispanic and Latino American judges
People from Wichita, Kansas
University of Michigan Law School alumni